Mobile and Ohio Railroad Depot may refer to:

Mobile and Ohio Railroad Depot (Murphysboro, Illinois), listed on the National Register of Historic Places in Jackson County, Illinois
Mobile and Ohio Railroad Depot (Aberdeen, Mississippi), listed on the National Register of Historic Places in Monroe County, Mississippi